Conchillas is a small industrial town located within the Colonia Department, in southwestern Uruguay.

Geography

History 

The town is said to have been founded by the English on 24 October 1887. It soon became an important place for the exploitation of mineral resources. The English created a factory, founded two cemeteries, and established an Anglican Church. It is also believed that they kept their own currency for economic transactions, which was widely accepted in the surroundings. 

However, with the outbreak of the Second World War, Conchillas key infrastructure was sold to two Uruguayan entrepreneurs who introduced a series of modifications. Today, the English influence that resulted from the arrival of numerous European settlers is mainly evident in the architecture of Conchillas rather than in the way of life of its inhabitants.

On 21 December 1955, the status of the localities known as "Conchillas y Gil" was elevated to "Pueblo" (village) under the common name "Conchillas" by the Act of Nº Ley 12.254.

Population 
According to the 2011 census, Conchillas had a population of 756.
 
Source: Instituto Nacional de Estadística de Uruguay
* In the 2011 census the population of the Pueblo Gil censual area (309 inh.) was counted separately from Conchillas.

See also 
 Barker, Uruguay

References

External links

Article on Conchillas at clarin.com 
INE map of Conchillas and Pueblo Gil

English diaspora
Populated places in the Colonia Department